Ghaseetpur Awan is a village in the Mirpur Tehsil of Mirpur District of Azad Kashmir, in Pakistan.

Demography 
According to the 1998 census of Pakistan, its population was 798.

References 

Populated places in Mirpur District